The Seychelles national football team represents the Seychelles in international football under the control of the Seychelles Football Federation (SFF). The football association was founded in 1980 and became fully affiliated to FIFA and the Confederation of African Football  (CAF) in 1986.

The following list contains all results of the Seychelles' official matches since joining FIFA and the CAF.

Key

FIFA results

1986

1987

1988

1989

1990

1992

1993

1994

1996

1998

2000

2002

2003

2005

2006

2007

2008

2009

2011

2012

2013

2014

2015

2016

2017

2018

2019

2020

2021

2022

2023

All-time record 
Key

 Pld = Matches played
 W = Matches won
 D = Matches drawn
 L = Matches lost

 GF = Goals for
 GA = Goals against
 GD = Goal differential
 Countries are listed in alphabetical order

As of 20 September 2022

See also
 Seychelles women's national football team results

References

External links 
ELO Ratings List of Matches
National Football Teams List of Matches
Soccerway List of Matches
RSSSF List of Matches

Results